Lokomotiv 1929 is a Bulgarian professional association football club based in Sofia, which currently plays in the First League, the top tier of Bulgarian football.

Founded as Railway Sports Club in 1929, and refounded in 2015, following bankruptcy, the club has played at Stadion Lokomotiv since 1985.

Lokomotiv has won four League titles and four Bulgarian Cups. Lokomotiv established itself as one of Bulgaria’s top clubs throughout history, performing strongly both domestically and internationally. The club has spent the majority of its history in the top tier First League (previously A Group), with brief interruptions including a short-lived merging with Slavia Sofia in 1969, as well as an administrative relegation in 2015, due to financial problems.

Lokomotiv traditionally play in red and black stripped shirts, with black shorts and red socks.

Honours

Domestic

First League:
  Winners (4): 1939–40, 1945, 1963–64, 1977–78
  Runners-up (6): 1941, 1946, 1947, 1957, 1964–65, 1994–95
  Third place (10): 1948–49, 1952, 1954, 1959–60, 1967–68, 1978–79, 1995–96, 2006–07, 2007–08, 2014–15

Bulgarian Second League:
 Runners-up (2): 2017–18, 2020–21

Bulgarian Cup:
  Winners (4): 1948, 1953, 1981–82, 1994–95
  Runners-up (2): 1974–75, 1976–77

European
Balkans Cup:
  Winners: 1973

UEFA Cup / UEFA Europa League
 Quarter-finals: 1980

European Railways Cup
  Winners (2): 1961, 1963

History

1929–1945: Foundation and early successes
Lokomotiv was founded on 2 September 1929 as Railway Sports Club (RSC) by a group of railway workers. RSC's first competitive game was a 2–1 victory against Zora Sofia on 3 October 1929. In the 1939–40 season, RSC won the Bulgarian title for first time in the team's history. The team was made by: Stoyo Nedyalkov (captain), Sl. Videnov, K. Kostov, D. Marinov, St. Angelov, As. Milushev, Krum Milev, L. Hranov. In 1945, the club had already been renamed Lokomotiv Sofia and won the title in the first post-war championship.

1960-1990: Continued domestic and European success

During season 1963–64 after 30 games, Lokomotiv won their third title after they defeated main rivals to the title Levski Sofia and Slavia Sofia. This achievement enabled Lokomotiv to participate in the 1964-65 European Cup preliminary round for the first time ever. Lokomotiv were drawn against Swedish champions Malmö. In the first leg, played at the Vasil Levski National Stadium in Sofia, Lokomotiv trashed their rivals with a score of 8-3, with Nikola Kotkov scoring five goals in that match. The Railroaders lost the second game in Sweden by 0-2, but still progressed to the first ground on aggregate. In the first round, Lokomotiv were drawn against Hungarian champions Gyóri ETO FC. In the first leg, played in Hungary, Lokomotiv Sofia lost by 5-3. The return leg in Sofia was crucial for Loko's progression to the next round. Lokomotiv won the game 4-3, but were eliminated on aggregate 8-7 by their Hungarian rivals, thus ending Lokomotiv's first European Cup adventure.

In 1969 the club was united with Slavia Sofia for a brief period to 1971 and is associated with the Bulgarian railway workers. In 1978, led by Atanas Mihaylov and Boycho Velichkov Lokomotiv won their fourth title. In Europe the club won European championship of the railwaymen two times in 1961 and 1963, and Balkans Cup in 1973.

In 1978, Lokomotiv were crowned champions for the fourth time, finishing one point above CSKA Sofia. This qualified the team for the European Cup for the second time in their history. In the first round, Lokomotiv faced Danish champions Odense. The first game in Denmark ended in a 2-2 tie, with Angel Kolev and Boycho Velichkov scoring important away goals. In the second game played on home soil, Lokomotiv managed to overcome a 0-1 deficit and won the game 2-1, thus progressing to the second round 4-3 on aggregate. In the second round, Lokomotiv were a drawn against a much tougher opponent, in the name of Köln from West Germany at the time. Seen as clear outsiders, Lokomotiv lost the first game in Sofia by 0-1, while they were brutally beaten 4-0 in the return leg in Köln, thus being eliminated from the European Cup.

In 1980 Lokomotiv reached a quarter final in the UEFA Cup where they faced VfB Stuttgart, eliminating before that Ferencváros, AS Monaco and Dynamo Kyiv. Against Stuttgart the team lost with 0–1 in Sofia and with 1–3 in Germany.

In 1982, Lokomotiv won the Bulgarian cup for the third time in its history, qualifying for the 1982-83 European Cup Winners Cup. Lokomotiv faced French team PSG. The first leg in Sofia ended in a 1-0 win, however the return leg ended in a heavy 5-1 defeat, which eliminated Lokomotiv.

Lokomotiv finished the 1984-85 season in fourth place, which enabled another UEFA Cup qualification, for season 1985-86. Lokomotiv’s first opponent was Cypriot side APOEL. After some drama in both legs, the Railroaders advanced to the second round with an aggregate score of 6-4. There, Lokomotiv faced Neuchâtel Xamax from Switzerland. Lokomotiv drew 1-1 at home, but failed to find the net in the return leg, which ended in a 0-0 draw. This score was unfavorable for Lokomotiv, since the away goals rule favored their Swiss opponents in this case, and Lokomotiv was eliminated.

1994–2015, Nikolay Gigov era; From Top Tier to Third League
The new era for Lokomotiv Sofia came in 1994 with the new president Nikolay Gigov. The football club's status was turned professional. For merely one year (1994–95), from a team struggling not to lose its place in the professional league, Lokomotiv won the silver medals in the Championship and the State Cup. The club's home ground is Lokomotiv Stadium with 25,000 places, included a junior training centre: Lokomotiv has an enthusiastic and well-organized fan-club. The team came fourth in the 2005–06 season in A PFG and qualified for the 2006–07 UEFA Cup first qualifying round, where they faced FK Makedonija Gjorče Petrov from the Republic of Macedonia. Lokomotiv beat the Macedonian side 2–0 in the first match in Sofia on 13 July 2006 and finished 1–1 as a guest in Macedonia and continued to the next round of the tournament. Next, they faced the team of Bnei Yehuda Tel Aviv, which they beat twice: 2–0 on 10 August 2006 and 4–0 on 24 August 2006. Their next opponent in the first round of the tournament was the team of Feyenoord Rotterdam. The first game in Sofia ended with a 2–2 draw, after Lokomotiv went ahead 2–0 early in the first half. The second game finished 0–0 and Lokomotiv Sofia were out of the UEFA tournament.

Domestically, Lokomotiv had an amazing run of 10 consecutive wins, before being stopped by CSKA Sofia in the direct clash for the second position. Eventually, Lokomotiv finished third with equal points with second-placed CSKA Sofia.

The 2007–08 season started promisingly for the team. In the UEFA Cup second qualifying round Lokomotiv eliminated Romanian side Oţelul Galaţi after a 3–1 win at home and a scoreless away draw. This marked 8 European games without a loss, which was a new national record for longest streak without a loss achieved by a Bulgarian team in all European competitions. The previous record of 7 games was held by Levski Sofia. In the next round, Lokomotiv faced the French Rennes and the loss 1–3 in the first leg in Sofia marked an end to the team's winning streak in Europe. The Bulgarian side showed a surprising rally in the second game in France, which they won 2–1 and were only a single goal short of making it to the extra time. For a second consecutive year, Lokomotiv were stopped short of entering the group stage of the UEFA Cup, despite being the first Bulgarian club in football history to snatch a victory on French soil. The team finished third during the 2014–15 season in the A PFG, but was denied a license for the European tournaments and A Group due to unpaid debts. Lokomotiv were relegated to Bulgaria's third division, the V Group.

FC Lokomotiv 1929: Lower leagues and return to the elite
After being relegated to the third tier of Bulgarian football, Lokomotiv experienced serious financial problems and the club was disqualified from the Third League, after which it was liquidated. Shortly after, some of the legends of the team including Ivan Vasilev, Boycho Velichkov and Anton Velkov formed a new club in A OFG Sofia (city) - north (4th division). The new club, now called Lokomotiv 1929 Sofia, is considered the rightful successor of the previous team, and thus carries over the history and honors won from the original team. The youth academy was also moved to the new club. Some other former players went back  to the club, as well as young players from the academy who were selected to the new first squad.

On 29 July 2016, the team was officially approved for the new Bulgarian Second League, skipping one level of Bulgarian football together with Tsarsko Selo Sofia. However, initially the team couldn’t get promoted to the First League until 2018-19 season due to the rule that a team can play in the highest level only after 3 seasons of existence. This was changed later, allowing Lokomotiv to promote as early as 2018, since the new team was considered to be the successor of the original Lokomotiv.

The 2017-18 season was very dramatical for Lokomotiv Sofia. They finished second in the Second League, which meant that they qualified for the promotion playoffs to enter First League. However, they were denied entry to the top tier by Vitosha Bistritsa, who beat them on penalties to stay in the league. Next season wasn’t as successful, with Lokomotiv only managing a mid-table result. For the 2019-20 season, Lokomotiv finished fourth, only three points behind Montana, who qualified for the promotion playoffs.

The 2020-21 season began well for Lokomotiv, as they managed to remain in first place in the league for the majority of the season before the winter break. Lokomotiv eventually managed to finish in second place, thus securing promotion to the First League after six years.

The first season since returning to the top level proved to be difficult. Lokomotiv, however, managed to secure their place in the league after a lot of drama in the relegation group of the 2021-22 season. The team eventually finished above Botev Vratsa and Tsarsko Selo, avoiding the drop. After the season ended, Lokomotiv announced that they had parted ways with Ivan Kolev and had appointed former Ludogorets manager Stanislav Genchev in his place, with Zhivko Milanov as assistant coach.

League positions

Statistics and records

Lokomotiv's first competitive game was a 2–1 victory against Zora Sofia on 3 November 1929.
Atanas Mihaylov holds Lokomotiv's overall appearance record—he played 348 matches over the course of 17 seasons from 1964 to 1981.
Lokomotiv's all-time leading scorer again is Atanas Mihaylov, who scored 145 goals. The most goals scored by a player in a single match is six; Tsvetan Genkov have achieved this feat in 2007.

Lokomotiv's biggest victory is 11–1 against Chavdar Byala Slatina in 1991 for Bulgarian Cup. Lokomotiv's 9–0 defeat of Chernomorets Burgas Sofia on 27 May 2007 was its largest league win. Lokomotiv's heaviest defeat, 0–8, came against Levski Sofia in 1994. Lokomotiv's 6–0 win against Neftchi Baku in the UEFA Cup was the largest victory in the Europe competition's history at the time.

European record

Supporters
Lokomotiv has a group of loyal fans known as Iron Brigades (Bulgarian: Железни бригади) who supported the team in the  lowest levels of the Bulgarian football. Lokomotiv's biggest rivalry is with Slavia Sofia. Lokomotiv's fans maintain a friendship with Spartak Varna and Austrian club FavAC.

Players

Current squad

For recent transfers, see Transfers summer 2022 and Transfers winter 2022–23.

Out on loan

Foreign players
Up to twenty foreign nationals can be registered and given a squad number for the first team in the Bulgarian First League, however only five non-EU nationals can be used during a match day. Those non-EU nationals with European ancestry can claim citizenship from the nation their ancestors came from. If a player does not have European ancestry he can claim Bulgarian citizenship after playing in Bulgaria for 5 years.

EU Nationals
 Celso Raposo

EU Nationals (Dual citizenship)
  Matheus Duarte
  Baboucarr Gaye
  David Malembana

Non-EU Nationals
 Alan Dias
 Bruno Franco
 França
 Kadu Ribeiro

Crest, shirt and mascot
Team main kit is red and black. Away kits are black and white.

On 11 February 2022 Lokomotiv signed a sponsorship contract with the Greek betting company Betano for 3 years.

Managers

Past seasons

References

External links
Official website
 News website
 Fans website
bgclubs.eu

 
Football clubs in Bulgaria
Association football clubs established in 1929
1929 establishments in Bulgaria
Phoenix clubs (association football)
Railway association football clubs in Bulgaria